Craig Young is an Australian rugby league footballer.

Craig Young may also refer to:

Craig Young (cricketer) (born 1990), Irish cricketer
Craig Robert Young (born 1976), British actor and singer
Craig Young (sailor), participated in 2011 Dragon World Championships